The Cabaniss-Hanberry House, about three miles northeast of Bradley, Georgia, was built by George Cabaniss  1805.  It was listed on the National Register of Historic Places in 1976.

It was deemed notable as "an outstanding example of early rural Georgia architecture" and for its age.  A related property is the Cabiness-Hunt House, already listed on the National Register, located about 2 miles west.

In 1975 the house had been unoccupied for several years, but Cabaniss descendants had plans for renovations.

References

Houses on the National Register of Historic Places in Georgia (U.S. state)
National Register of Historic Places in Jones County, Georgia
Houses in Jones County, Georgia
Houses completed in 1805